Xingtai University (邢台学院 Xíngtái xuéyuàn) is a university in Hebei, China under the provincial government.

References 

Universities and colleges in Hebei